Lanzenbach is a small river of Baden-Württemberg, Germany. It is a right tributary of the Bühler at Eschenau, a district of Vellberg.

See also
List of rivers of Baden-Württemberg

References

Rivers of Baden-Württemberg
Rivers of Germany